The royal flycatchers are a genus, Onychorhynchus, of passerine birds in the family Tityridae.

Names 
The specific epithet of the type species, coronatus, and the common name of all the species in this genus, royal flycatcher, refer to the striking, colourful crest, which is seen displayed very rarely, except after mating, while preening, in courtship as well as being handled.

The genus name Onychorhynchus comes from the Greek words  onyx "nail" and  rhynkhos "bill".

Species 
The International Ornithological Committee (IOC) and BirdLife International's Handbook of the Birds of the World (HBW) places four species in the genus: 

The North American and South American Classification Committees of the American Ornithological Society (AOS) treat the genus as having one species, royal flycatcher (Onychorhynchus coronatus), with four subspecies. They place it in family Onychorhynchidae with four other species of two genera that the IOC and HBW include in Tityridae. The Clements taxonomy also treats the royal flycatcher as one species with four subspecies. It places that species, the same four additional species as the AOS, and the sharpbill (Oxyruncus cristatus) in family Oxyruncidae, which the AOS reserves for the sharpbill alone.

References 

Onychorhynchus
Bird genera